Hibbertia fractiflexa is a species of flowering plant in the family Dilleniaceae and is endemic to the Northern Territory. It is a small, multi-stemmed shrub with hairy foliage, elliptic leaves, and yellow flowers arranged in leaf axils with sixteen to twenty-two stamens arranged in groups around the two carpels.

Description

Taxonomy
Hibbertia fractiflexa was first formally described in 2010 by Hellmut R. Toelken in the Journal of the Adelaide Botanic Gardens from specimens collected by Glenn Mitchell Wightman and Clyde Robert Dunlop near Waterfall Creek in 1984. The specific epithet (fractiflexa) means "zigzag" referring to the shape of the long shoots.

In the same journal, Toelken described four subspecies and the names are accepted by the Australian Plant Census:
 Hibbertia fractiflexa subsp. serotina Toelken is similar to subspecies brachyblastis but has twenty-four to twenty-six stamens and flowers in May.

Distribution and habitat
This hibbertia grows in the northern part of the Northern Territory. Subspecies brachyblastis usually grows in rocky places in woodland in Kakadu National Park, subsp. filicaulis among boulders in scrub, woodland and forest on the western escarpment of the Arnhem Land Plateau, subsp. fractiflexa on rocky slopes and sandstone outcrops in woodland on the lower slopes of the western escarpment of the Arnhem Land Plateau and subsp. serotina on steep, rocky slopes in woodland in Litchfield National Park.

Conservation status
Subspecies brachyblastis and fractiflexa are classified as of "least concern" and subspecies filicaulis and serotina as "data deficient" under the Territory Parks and Wildlife Conservation Act 1976.

See also
List of Hibbertia species

References

fractiflexa
Flora of the Northern Territory
Plants described in 2010
Taxa named by Hellmut R. Toelken